Korba Municipal Corporation (KMC) is the Municipal Corporation for the city of Chhattisgarh. Municipal Corporation mechanism in India was introduced during British Rule with formation of municipal corporation in Madras (Chennai) in 1688, later followed by municipal corporations in Bombay (Mumbai) and Calcutta (Kolkata) by 1762. The organization is known, in short, as KMC. This civic administrative body administers an area of 215.02 km2 (250.29 sq mi). KMC is headed by S.K. Dubey the Commissioner and Rajkishore Prasad the Mayor.

History and administration 

Korba Municipal Corporation was formed in 2000 to improve the infrastructure of the town as per the needs of local population. Korba Municipal Corporation has been categorised into  wards and each ward is headed by councillor for which elections are held every 5 years.

Korba Municipal Corporation is governed by mayor Rajkishore Prasad and administered by Municipal Commissioner Kuldeep Sharma.

References 

Korba, Chhattisgarh
Municipal corporations in Chhattisgarh
2000 establishments in Chhattisgarh